Steve Perry (born August 31, 1947) is an American television writer and science fiction author.

Biography
Perry is a native of the Deep South. His residences have included Louisiana, California, Washington, and Oregon. Prior to working full-time as a freelance writer, he worked as a swimming instructor, lifeguard, assembler of toys, a clerk in a hotel gift shop and car rental agency, aluminum salesman, martial art instructor, private detective, and nurse. His wife is Dianne Waller, a Port of Portland executive. They have two children and five grandsons. One of their children is science fiction author S. D. Perry.

He is a practitioner of the martial art Silat, which inspired him to create the fictional martial arts Sumito and Teräs Käsi, both of which are essentially fictionalized versions of Silat.

Literary career
Perry has written over fifty novels and numerous short stories, which have appeared in various magazines and anthologies. Perry is perhaps best known for the Matador series. He has written books in the Star Wars, Alien and Conan universes. He was a collaborator on all of the Tom Clancy's Net Force series, seven of which have appeared on the New York Times Bestseller list. Two of his novelizations, Star Wars: Shadows of the Empire and Men in Black have also been bestsellers. Other writing credits include articles, reviews, and essays, animated teleplays, and some unproduced movie scripts. One of his scripts for Batman: The Animated Series was an Emmy Award nominee for Outstanding Writing.

Perry is a member of the Science Fiction and Fantasy Writers of America, The Animation Guild, and the Writers Guild of America, West.

Published works
 Dome with J. Michael Reaves (1987) – present-day end of the world, prequel to Matador series in that it mentions Spetstods
 The Mask (novelization of The Mask) (1994)
 Trinity Vector (1996)
 The Digital Effect (1997)
 Men in Black (1998 Novelization)
 Time Was: Isaac Asimov's I-BOTS with Gary Braunbeck (1998)
 Titan A.E. (2000 Novelization) with Dal Perry
 Windowpane (2003)
 Tribes: Einstein's Hammer

Matador series
(original setting)
 The Man Who Never Missed (1985)
 Matadora (1986)
 The Machiavelli Interface (1986)
 The Omega Cage with J. Michael Reaves (1988)
 The 97th Step (1989)
 The Albino Knife (1991)
 Black Steel (1992)
 Brother Death (1992)
 The Musashi Flex (2006)
 The Siblings of the Shroud (forthcoming)
 Churl (working title – being written)

Conan series
 Conan the Fearless (1986)
 Conan the Defiant (1987)
 Conan the Indomitable (1989)
 Conan the Free Lance (1990)
 Conan the Formidable (1990)

Star Wars
 Shadows of the Empire (1996)
 Shadows of the Empire: Evolution (2000)

Star Wars MedStar
MedStar I: Battle Surgeons with Michael Reaves (2004)
MedStar II: Jedi Healer with Michael Reaves (2004)

Star Wars Death Star
Death Star with Michael Reaves (2007)

Aliens
 Aliens: Earth Hive (1992)
 Aliens: Nightmare Asylum (1993)
 Aliens: The Female War with Stephani Perry (1993)

Aliens vs. Predator
 Prey with Stephani Perry (1994)
 Hunter's Planet with David Bischoff (1994)

Predator
 Turnabout (2008)

Tom Clancy's Net Force
(created by Tom Clancy and Steve Pieczenik)
 Breaking Point (2000)
 Point of Impact (2001)
 Cybernation (2001)
 State of War (2003)
 Changing of the Guard (2003)
 Springboard with Larry Segriff
 The Archimedes Effect with Larry Segriff (2006)

Leonard Nimoy's Primortals

Target Earth (1997)

Star Risk
 Chris Bunch's The Gangster Conspiracy with Dal Perry (2007)

Stellar Ranger
 Stellar Ranger (1994)
 Lone Star (1994)

Time Machine

 Sword of the Samurai with J. Michael Reaves (1984)
 Civil War Secret Agent (1984)

Venture Silk
 Spindoc (1994)
 The Forever Drug (1995)

Indiana Jones
Indiana Jones and the Army of the Dead (2009)

Thong
 Thong the Barbarian Meets the Cycle Sluts of Saturn (1998) with J. Michael Reaves

Cutter's Wars
 The Ramal Extraction (2012)
 The Vastalimi Gambit (2013)
 The Tejano Conflict (2014)

The Matador series
The Matador series chronicles the birth, evolution, victory, and aftermath of a rebellion that overthrows a corrupt and declining interstellar government ("The Confederation") based on Earth. The Matador series features a fictional martial art known as "Sumito" or "The 97 Steps". Many of the non-English words and place names are actually in the Esperanto language.

The Man Who Never Missed

The rebellion proper begins in The Man Who Never Missed, in which Emile Khadaji deserts from the Confederation military after a particularly bloody battle and religious experience, eventually joining up with a bartending martial artist monk named Pen, who teaches Khadaji the art used by his order, Sumito ("The 97 steps"), before setting him on his own path. Khadaji learns economics and politics and military science and eventually decides he has to overthrow the Confederation. This he does by setting up a bar on a planet named Greaves, and while luring soldiers in by day, hunts and paralyzes them by night. Over many months, he paralyzes 2,388 of the 10,000 troops on the planet, only missing with a handful of shots, which he carefully conceals. Eventually, as the first paralyzed soldier awakens, he attacks the commander, is trapped in his bar, and apparently killed.

Afterward, the Confederation military realize that he apparently knocked out almost 2,400 soldiers without missing a single time, a record which becomes a legend, striking fear into the Confederation military ranks.

Juete who appears here is one of the major characters in The Omega Cage.

Kamus first appeared in two short stories by J. Michael Reaves in Volume 8 of the "Weird Heroes" series from Pyramid Books.  One of the stories is mentioned here.

Matadora
(From the back cover)

On some worlds, the name of Khadaji is a prayer for resistance fighters...

Khadaji... master warrior, martyr, legend. The one-man resistance to the Confed on Greaves. Known as "The Man Who Never Missed," he only let himself be taken when he'd done what he'd set out to do. With his death, Khadaji became the inspiration and idol of students of martial arts everywhere.

Matador Villa... the training center for the best fighters in the galaxy, disciples of the great Khadaji. A rigorous program of political tactics and psychological warfare, physical discipline, and martial force. A mysterious school on the planet Renault... its ultimate motives unknown.

Dirisha Zuri... a dangerous drifter, a dark-skinned beauty, Khadaji's colleague. A ronin, whose expertise in body control and knowledge of the fighting arts drew the attention of Matador Villa. The school wanted her talents... and the galaxy desperately needed her deadly skills.

Matadora, The legend of the Man Who Never Missed becomes the incredible mission of a single woman... The Matadora.

The Machiavelli Interface
(From the back cover)

Khadaji started it.
He had a vision on a bloody battlefield, a vision of the fall of the brutal Galactic Confederation, and of the new order that would come after. He made himself a legend, and that legend inspired a rebellion that swept across the stars.

The Matadors continued it.
In Khadaji's name, they learned, at Matador Villa, skills of body and mind that made them the most valuable – and feared – fighters in the universe.

Marcus Wall tried to stop it.
He used his immense wealth and corrupt power to close down the Villa, to outlaw the Matadors, to have their leader thrown into a Confed prison.

Now it is about to end.
The Matadors are coming out of hiding. They will move against the Confed. They will destroy Marcus Wall. They will do what has to be done to make Khadaji's dream a reality... No matter what the cost.

The Machiavelli Interface
The legend of The Man Who Never Missed.
The incredible journey of the Matadora.
Now the final battle of The Machiavelli Interface.

The 97th Step
(From the back cover)

MWILI was born on a cruel, desolate planet...and dreamed of the stars.

FERRET was a thief and smuggler on exotic worlds...until his ruin.

PEN was trained by the master warriors, the Siblings of the Shroud, learning the lethal skills that would someday forge a legend...and conquer an empire.

He lived three lives – the mentor and inspiration for THE MAN WHO NEVER MISSED. This is his story.

The Albino Knife
It takes more than death to kill an evil man.

Her father is a hero, a legend, the man who changed the history of the galaxy. The Man Who Never Missed-a man she never met. The Confederation defeated, Emile Khadaji disappeared, and now she must find him.

Her mother is a pawn in a dead man's game, bait in a trap to lure her father out of hiding. Marcus Jefferson Wall died on the day the revolution was won, but technology has given him a terrifying new way for the hand of vengeance to stretch beyond the grave.

She is the Matadors' secret weapon, an Albino Exotic bred for her sensuous beauty-but trained in the deadly arts. She is... The Albino Knife

Black Steel
Honor demands blood.

Kildee Wu is a sensei, a teacher, a master of martial arts. Her weapon is a 400-year-old black sword forged in secret; her ambition is to find the perfect student, one worthy of her blade.

Sleel is a thief, a poet, a scholar, a soldier, and one of the best of the Matadors, the elite cadre of bodyguards who sparked a revolution. Now, stripped of his honor, forbidden the weapons that set him apart, he must begin again.

Their enemy is hidden in the House of Black Steel, protected by power and money. He has stolen her secret, and his honor, and nearly claimed their lives. Their only hope of survival and vengeance lies in the strength of... Black Steel

Brother Death
Characters:

Terror strides across the galaxy

The elite who command the wealth of an entire planet. Each is given a warning of the impending assassination. Each is surrounded by bodyguards. But in every case, the death-stroke falls on time...

The veterans of a thousand off-world battles. He is the Matador; she's the quick-draw chief of the local cools. They alone can stop the march of Brother Death...

Against them, all stand the Few, the fanatical secret brotherhood. Armed with the secrets of a lost civilization, they revel in their own powers of destruction. And they obey one voice... Brother Death

The Musashi Flex
Follows the development of the 97 steps of sumito as well as the biochemical enhancement later used by Confed soldiers. The protagonist is a professional fighter, Lazlo Mourn, who walks the Musashi Flex, an illegal underground martial arts competition named after Miyamoto Musashi, which features both armed and unarmed combat.

Television
 The Centurions (1986)
 The Real Ghostbusters (1987)
 Spiral Zone (1987)
 Starcom: The U.S. Space Force (1987)
 Batman: The Animated Series (1992-1995)
 Conan and the Young Warriors (1994)
 Gargoyles (1995)
 Street Fighter (1996)
 Extreme Ghostbusters (1997)
 Godzilla: The Series (1998)
 Spider-Man Unlimited (1999–2000)

References

External links

 
 Blog
 
 

1947 births
Living people
Silat practitioners
American science fiction writers
Conan the Barbarian novelists
Writers from Portland, Oregon
20th-century American novelists
21st-century American novelists
American male novelists
Novelists from Oregon
20th-century American male writers
21st-century American male writers
The Magazine of Fantasy & Science Fiction people